Germany competed at the 2022 Winter Paralympics in Beijing, China which took place between 4–13 March 2022.

Medalists

The following German competitors won medals at the games. In the discipline sections below, the medalists' names are bolded.

Competitors
The following is the list of number of competitors participating at the Games per sport/discipline.

Alpine skiing

Germany competed in alpine skiing.

Men

Women

Biathlon

Germany competed in biathlon.

Men

Women

Cross-country skiing

Germany competed in cross-country skiing.

Men

Women

Relay

Snowboarding

Germany competed in snowboarding.

Slalom
Men

Snowboard cross
Men

Qualification legend: Q - Qualify to next round; FA - Qualify to medal final; FB - Qualify to consolation final

See also
Germany at the Paralympics
Germany at the 2022 Winter Olympics

References

Nations at the 2022 Winter Paralympics
2022
Winter Paralympics